Dear Santa or Secret Santa is a 1998 American Christmas film directed by Fred Olen Ray and starring D.L. Green, Harrison Myers, and Debra Rich.

Cast 
 D.L. Green -  Gordon / Gordon's Father
 Harrison Myers -   Teddy
 Debra Rich -   Carla
 Robert Quarry -   Mr. Ambrose (as Robert Connell)
 Richard Gabai -  Kirk
 Tena Fanning -   Lillith
 Ariana McClain - Margo
 Bennett Curland - Santa Claus
 Kim Ray -  The Elf 
 Rick Montana - Louie
 Michael Lee Jones - Donny
 Edrie Warner -  Mrs. Sanders

References

External links 
 
https://www.rottentomatoes.com/m/secret_santa/

1998 films
Films directed by Fred Olen Ray
American Christmas films
Santa Claus in film
1998 fantasy films
1990s English-language films